IJL may refer to:

International Journal of Lexicography
International Journal of Listening